The New Zealand national cricket team toured the West Indies in June 2002 to play two Test matches and five Limited Overs Internationals.

Squads

Tour match

50-over: West Indies Vice Chancellor's XI v New Zealanders

ODI series

1st ODI

2nd ODI

3rd ODI

4th ODI

5th ODI

Test series

1st Test

2nd Test

References

2001–02 West Indian cricket season
2002 in New Zealand cricket
2002 in West Indian cricket
International cricket competitions in 2002
2002